{{DISPLAYTITLE:C11H13FN2}}
The molecular formula C11H13FN2 (molar mass: 192.233 g/mol, exact mass: 192.1063 u) may refer to:

 5-Fluoro-AMT, also known as PAL-544
 6-Fluoro-AMT

Molecular formulas